The year 2018 is the 21st year in the history of the M-1 Global, a mixed martial arts promotion based in Russia.

List of events

M-1 Challenge 87 - Ashimov vs. Silander

M-1 Challenge 87 - Ashimov vs. Silander was a mixed martial arts event held by  M-1 Global on February 9, 2018 at the M-1 Arena in Saint Petersburg, Russia.

Background
This event will feature an interim world title fight for the M-1 Flyweight Championship between Arman Ashimov and Mikael Silander as M-1 Challenge 87 headliner.

Finnish welterweight Juho Valamaa got injured and can't fight at M-1 Challenge 87. Levan Solodovnik will take his place against Shavkat Rakhmonov.

Results

M-1 Challenge 88 - Ismagulov vs. Tutarauli

M-1 Challenge 88 - Ismagulov vs. Tutarauli was a mixed martial arts event held by  M-1 Global on February 22, 2018 at the Olimpiyskiy in Moscow, Russia.

Background
This event will feature two world title fight, first for the M-1 Lightweight Championship between Damir Ismagulov and Raul Tutarauli as M-1 Challenge 88 headliner, and a Bantamweight pairing between Movsar Evloev and Sergey Morozov for the M-1 Bantamweight Championship as co-headliner.

Giga Kukhalashvili unfortunately got injured 3 week before the event, Khadis Ibragimov  steep in to face Stephan Puetz.

Results

M-1 Challenge 89 - Buchinger vs. Krasnikov

M-1 Challenge 89 - Buchinger vs. Krasnikov was a mixed martial arts event held by  M-1 Global on March 10, 2018 at the M-1 Arena in Saint Petersburg, Russia.

Background
Chris Kelades had to withdraw due to visa issues. Oleg Aduchiev will step in as a replacement against Vitali Branchuk.

Results

M-1 Challenge 90 - Kunchenko vs. Butenko

M-1 Challenge 90 - Kunchenko vs. Butenko was a mixed martial arts event held by  M-1 Global on March 30, 2018 at the M-1 Arena in Saint Petersburg, Russia.

Background

Results

M-1 Challenge 91 - Swain vs. Nuertiebieke

M-1 Challenge 91 - Swain vs. Nuertiebieke was a mixed martial arts event held by  M-1 Global on May 12, 2018 at the Nanshan Culture & Sports Center in Shenzhen, China.

Background
M-1 Challenge 91 was supposed to be held April 21 at M-1 Arena in Saint Petersburg, Russia and featured a M-1 Featherweight Championship. bout between the champion Khamzat Dalgiev  and Nate Landwehr, but for unknown reasons the event was canceled the M-1 Challenge 91 event will now be held in Shenzhen, China. The fights from the card Saint Petersburg event will be rescheduled for the upcoming M-1 events.

Due to visa issues the fight for the undisputed flyweight title between the first M-1 Challenge flyweight champion Aleksander Doskalchuk and the interim champion Arman Ashimov was rescheduled for M-1 Challenge 92.

Results

M-1 Challenge 92 - Kharitonov vs. Vyazigin

M-1 Challenge 92 - Kharitonov vs. Vyazigin was a mixed martial arts event held by  M-1 Global on May 24, 2018 at the M-1 Arena in Saint Petersburg, Russia.

Background
Kharitonov win over Vyazigin at M-1 Challenge 95 declared no-contest after the commission gathered by the M-1 Global president Vadim Finkelchtein made the decision to change the result.

Busurmankul Abdibait Uulu got injured and was replaced by his fellow countryman Aziz Satybaldiev in the fight against Saba Bolaghi

Bair Shtepin got injured and was replaced by Ukrainian Ludwig Sholinyan in the fight against Alexander Osetrov.

Results

M-1 Challenge 93 - Shlemenko vs. Silva

M-1 Challenge 93 - Shlemenko vs. Silva was a mixed martial arts event held by  M-1 Global on June 1, 2018 at the Traktor Ice Arena in Chelyabinsk, Russia.

Background
This event has featured a middleweight superfight between the former Bellator Middleweight Champion and Bruno Silva as M-1 Challenge 93 headliner and a Middleweight pairing the champion Artem Frolov and Joe Riggs for the M-1 Middelweight Championship as co-headliner.

Results

M-1 Challenge 94 - Damkovsky vs. Ismagulov

M-1 Challenge 94 - Damkovsky vs. Ismagulov was a mixed martial arts event held by  M-1 Global on June 15, 2018 at the Traktor Ice Arena in Orenburg, Russia.

Background

Results

M-1 Challenge 95 - Battle in the Mountains 7

M-1 Challenge 95 - Battle in the Mountains 7 was a mixed martial arts event held by  M-1 Global on July 21, 2018 at The Mountain in Nazran, Russia.

Background
Alexander Lunga got injured and was replaced by Zaka Fatullazade in the bantamweight bout against Sergey Morozov.

Abubakar Mestoev got injured and was replaced by his fellow countryman Khamzat Aushev in the catchweight bout against Jorge Rodrigues Silva.

Results

M-1 Challenge 96 - Mikutsa vs. Ibragimov

M-1 Challenge 96 - Mikutsa vs. Ibragimov was a mixed martial arts event held by  M-1 Global on August 25, 2018 at the M-1 Arena in Saint Petersburg, Russia.

Background
Maksim Grabovich was scheduled to face Ruslan Rakhmonkulov at this event. However, Rakhmonkulov missed weight by over 8 pounds and the bout was canceled.

Maksim Melnik got injured, Dmitriy Tikhonyuk steps in to replace Melnik against Boris Medvedev.

Results

M-1 Challenge 97 - Bogatov vs. Pereira

M-1 Challenge 97 - Bogatov vs. Pereira was a mixed martial arts event held by  M-1 Global on September 28, 2018 at the Basket-Hall Arena in Kazan, Russia.

Background

Fight Card

M-1 Challenge 98 - Frolov vs. Silva

M-1 Challenge 98 - Frolov vs. Silva was a mixed martial arts event held by  M-1 Global on November 2, 2018 in Chelyabinsk, Russia.

Background

Fight Card

M-1 Challenge 99: Battle Of Narts 4

M-1 Challenge 99: Battle Of Narts 4 was a mixed martial arts event held by  M-1 Global on November 17, 2018 in Nazran, Russia.

Background

Fight Card

M-1 Challenge 100 - Battle in Atyrau

M-1 Challenge 100: Battle in Atyrau was a mixed martial arts event held by  M-1 Global on December 15, 2018 in Atyrau, Kazakhstan.

Background

Fight Card

References

M-1 Global events
2018 in mixed martial arts
M-1 Global events